The Belarusian Federation of Practical Shooting, Belarusian Беларуская федэрацыя практычнай стральбы, is the Belarusian association for practical shooting under the International Practical Shooting Confederation.

External links 
 Official homepage of the Belarusian Federation of Practical Shooting

Regions of the International Practical Shooting Confederation
Sports organizations of Belarus
Sports organizations established in 2008
2008 establishments in Belarus